Liolaemus millcayac is a species of lizard in the family Iguanidae.  It is found in Argentina.

References

millcayac
Lizards of South America
Reptiles of Argentina
Endemic fauna of Argentina
Reptiles described in 2013
Taxa named by Cristian Simón Abdala
Taxa named by Viviana Isabel Juárez Heredia